Ugo Frigerio (16 September 1901 – 7 July 1968) was an Italian race walker. He competed in four events at the 1920, 1924 and 1932 Olympics ranging from 3 to 50 km and won three gold and one bronze medals. He was the Olympic flag bearer for Italy in 1924 and 1932.

Biography
Nationally Frigerio won nine race walking titles: in the 3 km (1921, 1922), 10 km (1919–1922, 1924, 1931), and one-hour walk (1920).

Before the 3 km Olympic race in 1920 in Antwerp Frigerio gave pages of sheet music that he wanted to hear to the band playing at the competition venue. During the race he would scold the conductor when the band was deviating from its tempo, and chat to the public, which eventually began to cheer him.

Frigerio semi-retired after learning that race walking was excluded from the 1928 Summer Olympics. He resumed training in 1931 to prepare for the 1932 Games, where the only walking event was 50 km, five times longer than his favorite 10 km distance. He won a bronze medal and retired for good, becoming a sports administrator. In 1934, he wrote an autobiography titled Marciando nel nome dell’Italia (Walking in the Name of Italy).

Olympic achievements

See also
 Legends of Italian sport - Walk of Fame
 List of multiple Olympic gold medalists
 FIDAL Hall of Fame

References

External links
 

1901 births
1968 deaths
Italian male racewalkers
Athletes (track and field) at the 1920 Summer Olympics
Athletes (track and field) at the 1924 Summer Olympics
Athletes (track and field) at the 1932 Summer Olympics
Olympic athletes of Italy
Olympic gold medalists for Italy
Olympic bronze medalists for Italy
Athletes from Milan
Medalists at the 1932 Summer Olympics
Medalists at the 1924 Summer Olympics
Medalists at the 1920 Summer Olympics
Olympic gold medalists in athletics (track and field)
Olympic bronze medalists in athletics (track and field)
20th-century Italian people